Midnight in Paris is a 2011 fantasy comedy film written and directed by Woody Allen. Set in Paris, the film follows Gil Pender (Owen Wilson), a screenwriter, who is forced to confront the shortcomings of his relationship with his materialistic fiancée (Rachel McAdams) and their divergent goals, which become increasingly exaggerated as he travels back in time each night at midnight.

Produced by the Spanish group Mediapro and Allen's US-based Gravier Productions, the film stars Wilson, McAdams, Kathy Bates, Adrien Brody, Carla Bruni, Tom Hiddleston, Marion Cotillard, and Michael Sheen. It premiered at the 2011 Cannes Film Festival and was released in the United States on May 20, 2011. The film opened to critical acclaim and is considered one of Allen's best films in recent years. In 2012, it won the Academy Award for Best Original Screenplay and the Golden Globe Award for Best Screenplay. It was nominated for three other Academy Awards: Best Picture, Best Director and Best Art Direction.

Plot
In 2010, Gil Pender, a successful but disillusioned Hollywood screenwriter, and his fiancée Inez are in Paris vacationing with Inez's wealthy, Republican parents. Gil is struggling to finish his debut novel, about a man who works in a nostalgia shop, and finds himself drawn to the rich artistic history of Paris, especially the Lost Generation of the 1920s. 

Inez dismisses his ambitions to move to Paris and write as a delusional dream and encourages him to stick with more lucrative screenwriting assignments. By chance, they meet Inez's friend Paul and his wife Carol, and Inez invites them to join Gil and her as they sightsee. 

Paul speaks with great authority but questionable accuracy on every subject they encounter, even contradicting a tour guide at the Musée Rodin, where he insists his knowledge of Rodin's relationships is more accurate than the guide's. Gil finds him pedantic and annoying, yet Inez adores him.

A night of wine tasting gets Gil drunk, and he decides to walk the streets of Paris to return to the hotel; Inez goes off with Paul and Carol by taxi. Gil stops to get his bearings, and at midnight, a 1920s car pulls up beside him. The passengers urge him to join them and he finds himself at a party for Jean Cocteau attended by notable people of the 1920s Paris art scene: Cole Porter, his wife Linda Lee Porter, and Zelda and Scott Fitzgerald. 

Zelda gets bored and encourages Scott and Gil to leave with her. They first head to Bricktops, where they see Josephine Baker dancing, and then to a cafe where they run into Ernest Hemingway and Juan Belmonte. 

After Zelda and Scott leave, Gil and Hemingway discuss writing, and Hemingway offers to show Gil's novel to Gertrude Stein. But as Gil exits the building to fetch his manuscript from his hotel, he returns to 2010: the cafe where he encountered Hemingway is now a laundromat.

The next night, Gil tries to share his time-travel experience with Inez, but she ditches Gil before the clock strikes midnight. When it does, the same car returns. Gil joins Hemingway on his way to visit Gertrude Stein’s apartment, where Gil is introduced to Stein, who is in the midst of giving Pablo Picasso a negative critique of a new painting of Picasso’s lover Adriana. Gil is instantly drawn to Adriana, a costume designer who has also had affairs with Amedeo Modigliani and Georges Braque. Stein reads aloud the novel's first line:
 Adriana praises his writing, and admits that she has always had a longing for the past, especially the Belle Époque.

Back in 2010, Gil continues his time travel for the next couple of nights. Inez is unimpressed with the boulevards and bistros and Gil's disappearing, while her father is suspicious and hires a private detective to follow him. 

Adriana leaves Picasso and continues to bond with Gil; although, he is conflicted by his attraction to her. Gil explains his inner conflict to Salvador Dalí, Man Ray, and Luis Buñuel, but as surrealists, they find nothing unusual about his claim of coming from the future. Gil later suggests the plot of the film The Exterminating Angel to Buñuel, which he doesn't understand.

Inez and her parents are traveling to Mont Saint Michel while Gil meets Gabrielle, an antique dealer and fellow admirer of the Lost Generation. He buys a Cole Porter gramophone record from her and later finds Adriana's diary from the 1920s at a book stall by the Seine which reveals that she was in love with him. Reading that she dreamed of receiving a gift of earrings from him and then making love to him, Gil tries to steal a pair of Inez's earrings to give to Adriana, but is thwarted by Inez's early return to the hotel room.

Gil buys earrings for Adriana and returns to the past. He takes Adriana for a walk, they kiss, and he gives her the earrings. While she's putting them on, a horse-drawn carriage comes down the street, and a richly dressed couple inside the carriage invite Gil and Adriana for a ride. The carriage transports the passengers to the Belle Époque, an era Adriana considers Paris's Golden Age. 

Gil and Adriana go first to Maxim's Paris, then to the Moulin Rouge where they meet Henri de Toulouse-Lautrec, Paul Gauguin, and Edgar Degas. Gil asks what they believe the best era was, and the three agree it is the Renaissance. 

The excited Adriana is offered a job designing ballet costumes and proposes to Gil that they stay, but Gil, upon observing the unhappiness of Adriana and the other artists, realizes that chasing nostalgia is fruitless because life, and thus, the present, is always "a little unsatisfying." Adriana, however, decides to stay in the 1890s, and they part ways.

Gil rewrites the first two chapters of his novel and retrieves his draft from Stein, who praises his progress as a writer and tells him that Hemingway likes it but questions why the main character has not realized that his fiancée, based on Inez, is having an affair with a character based on Paul.

Gil returns to 2010 and confronts Inez. She admits to having slept with Paul, but disregards it as a meaningless fling and that they can discuss it after their wedding. Gil breaks up with her and decides to move to Paris. Walking by the Seine at midnight, Gil bumps into Gabrielle; he offers to walk her home after it starts to rain. They learn that they share a love for Paris in the rain.

Cast
Main Cast

This is the second time McAdams and Wilson co-starred as a couple; they did so before in 2005's Wedding Crashers. In comparing the two roles, McAdams describes the one in Midnight in Paris as being far more antagonistic than the role in Wedding Crashers. Allen had high praises for her performance and that of co-star Marion Cotillard. Cotillard was cast as Wilson's other love interest, the charismatic Adriana.

Carla Bruni, singer-songwriter and wife of former French president Nicolas Sarkozy, was recruited by Allen for a role as a museum guide. There were false reports that Allen re-filmed Bruni's scenes with Léa Seydoux, but Seydoux rebuffed these rumors revealing she had an entirely separate role in the film. Allen also shot down reports that a scene with Bruni required over 30 takes: "I am appalled. I read these things and I could not believe my eyes ... These are not exaggerations, but inventions from scratch. There is absolutely no truth." He continued to describe Bruni as "very professional" and insisted he was pleased with her scenes, stating that "every frame will appear in the film."

Production

Writing
Allen employed a reverse approach in writing the screenplay for this film, by building the film's plot around a conceived movie title, 'Midnight in Paris'. The time-travel portions of Allen's storyline are evocative of the Paris of the 1920s described in Ernest Hemingway's 1964 posthumously published memoir A Moveable Feast, with Allen's characters interacting with the likes of Hemingway, Gertrude Stein, and F. Scott and Zelda Fitzgerald, and uses the phrase "a moveable feast" in two instances, with a copy of the book appearing in one scene. Allen originally wrote the character Gil as an East Coast intellectual, but he rethought it when he and casting director Juliet Taylor began considering Owen Wilson for the role. "I thought Owen would be charming and funny but my fear was that he was not so Eastern at all in his persona," says Allen. Allen realised that making Gil a Californian would actually make the character richer, so he rewrote the part and submitted it to Wilson, who readily agreed to do it. Allen describes him as "a natural actor". The set-up has certain plot points in common with the 1990s British sitcom Goodnight Sweetheart.

Filming
Principal photography began in Paris in July 2010. Allen states that the fundamental aesthetic for the camera work was to give the film a warm ambience. He describes that he likes it (the cinematography), "intensely red, intensely warm, because if you go to a restaurant and you're there with your wife or your girlfriend, and it's got red-flecked wallpaper and turn-of-the-century lights, you both look beautiful. Whereas if you're in a seafood restaurant and the lights are up, everybody looks terrible. So it looks nice. It's very flattering and very lovely." To achieve this he and his cinematographer, Darius Khondji, used primarily warm colours in the film's photography, filmed in flatter weather and employed limited camera movements, in attempts to draw little attention to itself. This is the first Woody Allen film to go through a digital intermediate, instead of being coloir timed in the traditional photochemical way. According to Allen, its use here is a test to see if he likes it enough to use on his future films.

Allen's directorial style placed more emphasis on the romantic and realistic elements of the film than the fantasy elements. He states that he "was interested only in this romantic tale, and anything that contributed to it that was fairytale was right for me. I didn't want to get into it. I only wanted to get into what bore down on his (Owen Wilson's) relationship with Marion."

Locations
The film opens with a -minute postcard-view montage of Paris, showing some of the iconic tourist sites. Kenneth Turan of the Los Angeles Times describes the montage as a stylistic approach that lasts longer than necessary to simply establish location. According to Turan, "Allen is saying: Pay attention – this is a special place, a place where magic can happen." Midnight in Paris is the first Woody Allen film shot entirely on location in Paris, though both Love and Death (1975) and Everyone Says I Love You (1996) were partially filmed there.

Filming locations include Giverny, John XXIII Square (near Notre Dame), Montmartre, Deyrolle, the Palace of Versailles, the Opéra, Pont Alexandre III, the Sacré-Cœur, the Île de la Cité itself, and streets near the Panthéon.

Marketing

The film is co-produced by Allen's Gravier Productions and the Catalan company Mediapro and was picked up by Sony Pictures Classics for distribution. It is the fourth film the two companies have co-produced, the others being Sweet and Lowdown, Whatever Works and You Will Meet a Tall Dark Stranger.

In promoting the film, Allen was willing to do only a limited amount of publicity at its Cannes Film Festival debut in May. Wilson was already committed to promoting Pixar's Cars 2, which opened in late June, several weeks after Allen's film arrived in cinemas. Due to these challenges and the relatively small ($10 million) budget for promotion, Sony Classics had to perform careful media buying and press relations to promote the film.

The film's poster is a reference to Vincent van Gogh's 1889 painting The Starry Night.

Release

Box office
The film made its debut at the 2011 Cannes Film Festival on Wednesday May 11, when it opened the festival as a first screening for both professionals and the public; it was released nationwide in France that same day, Wednesday being the traditional day of change in French cinemas. It went on limited release in six theaters in the United States on May 20 and took $599,003 in the first weekend, spreading to 944 cinemas three weeks later, when it went on wide release.

Midnight in Paris achieved the highest gross of any of Allen's films in North America, before adjusting for inflation. The film earned $56.3 million in North America, overtaking his previous best, Hannah and Her Sisters, at $40 million. Documents from the Sony Pictures hack revealed the film turned a profit of $24 million.

As of 2016, Midnight in Paris is the highest-grossing film directed by Woody Allen, with $151 million worldwide on a $17 million budget.

Critical reception
Midnight in Paris received critical acclaim. On Rotten Tomatoes the film has an approval rating of 93%, based on 224 reviews, with an average rating of 7.80/10. The site's critical consensus reads, "It may not boast the depth of his classic films, but the sweetly sentimental Midnight in Paris is funny and charming enough to satisfy Woody Allen fans." The film has received Allen's best reviews and score on the site since 1994's Bullets Over Broadway. On Metacritic, the film has a score of 81 out of 100, based on 40 reviews, indicating "universal acclaim".

The film received some generally positive reviews after its premiere at the 64th Cannes Film Festival. Todd McCarthy from The Hollywood Reporter praised Darius Khondji's cinematography and claimed the film "has the concision and snappy pace of Allen's best work".

A. O. Scott of The New York Times commented on Owen Wilson's success at playing the Woody Allen persona. He states that the film is marvelously romantic and credibly blends "whimsy and wisdom". He praised Khondji's cinematography, the supporting cast and remarked that it is a memorable film and that "Mr. Allen has often said that he does not want or expect his own work to survive, but as modest and lighthearted as Midnight in Paris is, it suggests otherwise: Not an ambition toward immortality so much as a willingness to leave something behind—a bit of memorabilia, or art, if you like that word better—that catches the attention and solicits the admiration of lonely wanderers in some future time."

Roger Ebert gave the film  stars out of 4. He ended his review thus:

This is Woody Allen's 41st film. He writes his films himself, and directs them with wit and grace. I consider him a treasure of the cinema. Some people take him for granted, although Midnight in Paris reportedly charmed even the jaded veterans of the Cannes press screenings. There is nothing to dislike about it. Either you connect with it or not. I'm wearying of movies that are for "everybody" – which means, nobody in particular. Midnight in Paris is for me, in particular, and that's just fine with moi.

Richard Roeper, an American film critic, gave Midnight in Paris an "A"; referring to it as a "wonderful film" and "one of the best romantic comedies in recent years". He commented that the actors are uniformly brilliant and praised the film's use of witty one-liners.

In The Huffington Post, Rob Kirkpatrick said the film represented a return to form for the director ("it's as if Woody has rediscovered Woody") and called Midnight in Paris "a surprising film that casts a spell over us and reminds us of the magical properties of cinema, and especially of Woody Allen's cinema."

Midnight in Paris has been compared to Allen's The Purple Rose of Cairo (1985), in that the functioning of the magical realism therein is never explained. David Edelstein, New York, commended that approach, stating that it eliminates, "the sci-fi wheels and pulleys that tend to suck up so much screen time in time-travel movies." He goes on to applaud the film stating that, "this supernatural comedy isn't just Allen's best film in more than a decade; it's the only one that manages to rise above its tidy parable structure and be easy, graceful, and glancingly funny, as if buoyed by its befuddled hero's enchantment."

Peter Johnson of PopCitizen felt that the film's nature as a "period piece" was far superior to its comedic components, which he referred to as lacking. "While the period settings of Midnight in Paris are almost worth seeing the film ... it hardly qualifies as a moral compass to those lost in a nostalgic revelry," he asserts.

Joe Morgenstern of The Wall Street Journal acknowledged the cast and the look of the film and, despite some familiarities with the film's conflict, praised Allen's work on the film. He wrote, "For the filmmaker who brought these intertwined universes into being, the film represents new energy in a remarkable career.".

Peter Bradshaw of The Guardian, giving the film 3 out of 5 stars, described it as "an amiable amuse-bouche" and "sporadically entertaining, light, shallow, self-plagiarising." He goes on to add that it's "a romantic fantasy adventure to be compared with the vastly superior ideas of his comparative youth, such as the 1985 movie The Purple Rose of Cairo." In October 2013, the film was voted by the Guardian readers as the ninth best film directed by Woody Allen.

More scathing is Richard Corliss of Time, who describes the film as "pure Woody Allen. Which is not to say great or even good Woody, but a distillation of the filmmaker's passions and crotchets, and of his tendency to pass draconian judgment on characters the audience is not supposed to like. ... his Midnight strikes not sublime chimes but the clangor of snap judgments and frayed fantasy."

Quentin Tarantino named Midnight in Paris as his favorite film of 2011.

The film was well received in France. The website Allocine (Hello Cinema) gave it 4.2 out of 5 stars based on a sample of twenty reviews. Ten of the reviews gave it a full five stars, including Le Figaro, which praised the film's evocation of its themes and said "one leaves the screening with a smile on one's lips".

Faulkner estate
The William Faulkner estate later filed a lawsuit against Sony Pictures Classics for the film's bit of dialogue, "The past is not dead. Actually, it's not even past," a paraphrasing of an often-quoted line from Faulkner's 1950 book Requiem for a Nun ("The past is never dead. It's not even past."), claiming that the paraphrasing was an unlicensed use of the estate. Faulkner is directly credited in the dialogue when Gil claims to have met the writer at a dinner party (though Faulkner is never physically portrayed in the film). Julie Ahrens of the Fair Use Project at the Stanford University's Center for Internet and Society was quoted as saying in response to the charge, "The idea that one person can control the use of those particular words seems ridiculous to me. Any kind of literary allusion is ordinarily celebrated. This seems to squarely fall in that tradition." Sony's response stated that they consider the action "a frivolous lawsuit".  In July 2013, a federal judge in Mississippi dismissed the lawsuit on fair use grounds.

Accolades

Home media
The soundtrack was released on December 9, 2011, and released on Blu-ray and DVD on December 20, 2011.

References

External links
  (US)
  (France)
 Jonathan Jones: "Midnight in Paris: a beginner's guide to modernism" The Guardian, October 11, 2011.
 
 
 
 
 
 Midnight in Paris at Sony Pictures Classics
 
 Midnight in Paris at The Numbers

2011 independent films
2011 romantic comedy films
2010s English-language films
2010s American films
2010s Spanish films
2010s fantasy comedy films
2010s romantic fantasy films
2011 films
American fantasy comedy films
American independent films
American romantic comedy films
American romantic fantasy films
Cultural depictions of Cole Porter
Cultural depictions of Edgar Degas
Cultural depictions of Ernest Hemingway
Cultural depictions of F. Scott Fitzgerald
Cultural depictions of Gertrude Stein
Cultural depictions of Henri de Toulouse-Lautrec
Cultural depictions of Henri Matisse
Cultural depictions of Josephine Baker
Cultural depictions of Luis Buñuel
Cultural depictions of Pablo Picasso
Cultural depictions of Paul Gauguin
Cultural depictions of Salvador Dalí
English-language Spanish films
Films about screenwriters
Films directed by Woody Allen
Films produced by Letty Aronson
Films produced by Stephen Tenenbaum
Films set in the 1890s
Films set in the 1920s
Films set in 2010
Films set in Paris
Films shot in Paris
Films whose writer won the Best Original Screenplay Academy Award
2010s French-language films
Magic realism films
Films with screenplays by Woody Allen
Sony Pictures Classics films
Spanish fantasy comedy films
Spanish independent films
Spanish romantic comedy films
Films about time travel
Warner Bros. films